Institute for Supply Management (ISM) is the oldest, and the largest, supply management association in the world. Founded in 1915, the U.S.-based not-for-profit educational association serves professionals and organizations with a keen interest in supply management, providing them education, training, qualifications, publications, information, and research.

ISM currently has over 50,000 members in more than 100 countries. It offers three qualifications, the Certified Professional in Supply Management (CPSM), Certified Professional in Supplier Diversity (CPSD), and the Associate Professional in Supply Management (APSM) and, in partnership with CAPS Research.

History
Institute for Supply Management originated in 1915 as the National Association of Purchasing Agents (N.A.P.A.).

In the early twentieth century, purchasing and the function that it served and represented did not enjoy the full support of management, which was typically indifferent to it or unaware of its potential. Prior to 1915, local purchasing associations had formed in at least 10 major cities in the U.S., including one of the most active groups in Buffalo (founded in 1904). There was a realization among some purchasers that they needed a national group to advance their profession and share useful information among members, but support was spotty. There was a certain level of distrust organizers had to overcome as buyers were practically strangers to each other and feared that their participation would reveal information that could benefit rival companies. As Charles A. Steele, president of N.A.P.A. stated in 1923:

 ...it had been a sort of unwritten rule that purchasers were one body of men who should not communicate with each other for fear that they might do the other fellow some good and themselves some harm.

Ironically, it was not a purchasing agent but a salesman working for the Thomas Publishing Company by the name of Elwood B. Hendricks who realized the full potential of the buying function and was the driving force behind forming a national purchasing association. In 1913, Hendricks's plan began to bear fruit when he helped form the Purchasing Agents Association of New York that was to become the nucleus of the national organization. The New York group applied for and received a charter  for N.A.P.A. in 1915. The first local groups to affiliate with the new national association were New York City and Pittsburgh in 1915 and Columbus in 1916. South Bend, Cleveland, Chicago, St. Louis, Philadelphia, Detroit and Los Angeles followed them in 1917. Buffalo later affiliated with N.A.P.A. in 1918 and by 1920 there were over 30 affiliates and that number continued to skyrocket. Hendricks efforts were so instrumental in the organization's success that it gave him an honorary lifetime membership.

The goals of N.A.P.A. were to:
 Impress the business world with the importance of the purchasing function to economic well-being.
 Encourage purchasing people to improve themselves and make greater contributions to the companies they serve.

The new national association was three affiliates strong when it held its first convention in New York in 1916 with 100 of its 250 members in attendance. That year also saw N.A.P.A. launch a magazine, The Purchasing Agent, that was to have an immense impact on the success of the organization and eventually evolve into the association's current Inside Supply Management magazine. In 1918, approximately one thousand members were expected to attend that year's national convention.

The new association gathered steam and soon began to make its presence felt on the national stage. Within five years, N.A.P.A. membership had soared and it had 32 affiliates and many more would join over the coming decades.

World War I and the 1920s
With the entry of the United States into World War I in 1917, N.A.P.A. offered its services to President Wilson to aid in the buying of materials. With the industrial war effort in high gear, materials were scarcer and procurement had become more complicated as the U.S. government "attempted to guide economic activity via centralized price and production controls." It was a time of opportunity that allowed purchasing to prove itself.
Purchasing agents nationwide began to exert themselves as departments in their plants that typically claimed purchasing rights were now too busy to interfere in procurement and purchasing agents proved to management they could help keep production up.

It was also during this time that N.A.P.A. members helped establish purchasing courses at New York University and Harvard. It was a small step, but the first seeds of N.A.P.A.’s renowned purchasing education program had been planted. The association was also deep in standards work and discussing a code of ethics for the purchasing profession.

During the 1920s, it became clear to businesses the centralization of purchasing was not a fad. N.A.P.A.'s efforts to promote the field bore fruit and
the business world began to view purchasing in a more favorable light.

During World War I, N.A.P.A. called for the centralization of War Department purchasing to reduce inefficiency and graft. The association began to flex its muscle and demanded standardization in the purchase and use of coal and the prosecution of profiteers. Its crusade for ethical standards resulted in the Purchasing Agent’s Creed that observers hailed for decades as one of the outstanding moral statements in modern business. In 1928, it released the Standards for Buying and Selling with the recognition that buying and selling should be mutually profitable and that cooperation would reduce the cost of purchasing.

The Great Depression and World War II
During the 1930s, N.A.P.A. undertook an intensive effort to improve education and develop standards. The Harvard Business School published two purchasing textbooks and it developed case studies about purchasing problems, all under the auspices of N.A.P.A. The association also commissioned a highly regarded authoritative two-volume work on purchasing practices and procedures.

In 1931, the association continued its push toward excellence, when it established the J. Shipman Gold Medal Award, the highest honor in the field, bestowed on an individual for exceptional performance who advanced the cause of supply management.

As the Great Depression gripped the world, N.A.P.A. created its Business Survey Committee in 1931 and began polling members on commodities. The U.S. Chamber of Commerce began using these reports when compiling information for the federal government. These reports would eventually evolve into the association's market-moving report now known as the ISM Report On Business a highly regarded indicator of the health of the U.S. economy.

When World War II broke out, N.A.P.A. again rose to Washington's call for assistance and kept its members routinely updated on government requirements and regulations during wartime production. As the government placed controls on producers and consumers, many of N.A.P.A.’s members played a critical role in the process. With the return to a peacetime free market, purchasing executives faced new complexities with higher costs and increased shortages requiring innovative techniques. Again, N.A.P.A. led the way by making its educational content even more robust and wide-ranging.

N.A.P.A rebranded as NAPM

By the 1950s, N.A.P.A.’s prestige had grown along with the function that it served. Membership during this period hit 15,000. N.A.P.A. intensified its efforts to develop a new image for the purchasing profession in the eyes of the public, educators, management and purchasing executives. As companies battled ever more fiercely for a better return on their investment and greater market share, they eventually came to the realization that purchasing was spending, on average, one-half of corporate sales income, and began demanding that purchasing make positive contributions to attaining corporate goals.

In the eyes of U.S. companies, purchasing was no longer acting as a mere agent—it had been transformed into a vital management function. To accurately reflect this fundamental shift in purchasing's role, in 1968, N.A.P.A. changed its name to the National Association of Purchasing Management, Inc. (NAPM).

As early as 1966, NAPM's leadership recognized the importance of developing a national certification program to create a standard on which to judge a competent purchaser. After careful groundwork, in 1974, NAPM introduced the Certified Purchasing Manager (C.P.M) qualification, the first professional certification in the field.

The association continued its educational efforts and in 1976 conducted its first ever onsite plant training. NAPM was cognizant of the profound social changes the country had been undergoing and became involved in minority and women's initiatives and even elected May Warzocha as its first woman president in 1979. In 1987, it formed the Minority Business Development Group to assist members with their minority supplier programs.

The Report On Business continued to gain recognition as the most reliable near-term economic barometer available. In 1982, NAPM introduced the Purchasing Manager's Index (PMI) and in 1988 it added diffusion indexes and introduced a graph format. In 1989, the U.S. Department of Commerce began including NAPM's data as a component of its Index of Leading Indicators and the Chairman of the Federal Reserve praised the Report. In 1998, the association added to the value of the Report when it developed the Non-Manufacturing Report On Business.

Transformation to ISM
As the field grew in complexity and became more global, purchasing professionals were becoming more responsible for the supply of goods and services instead of strictly purchasing. To more accurately reflect the scope that the profession encompassed, NAPM members voted in April 2001 to change the organization's name to Institute for Supply Management (ISM), which became effective in January 2002.

In 2002, ISM launched its sustainability and social responsibility initiative and in 2004 issued its ISM Principles of Social Responsibility, the first of their kind for the supply management profession.

To ensure a strong group of future supply management leaders, in 2005, ISM partnered with the R. Gene and Nancy D. Richter Foundation to expand the R. Gene Richter Scholarship Program into the largest national scholarship program in the field of supply management. Together, in 2008, they established the ISM R. Gene Richter Scholarship Program Fund with a goal of providing for the funding of scholarships on an ongoing basis.

To accurately address the range of demands required to master supply management, in 2008, ISM introduced a new professional qualification the Certified Professional in Supply Management (CPSM) to replace the C.P.M. The CPSM represents the highest degree of professional competencies and is built on an in-depth analysis of supply management functions across industries.

In 2011, ISM introduced the Certified Professional in Supplier Diversity (CPSD) certification to create experts who could help guide their companies through supplier diversity issues, harness underutilized, innovative suppliers and tap into new markets. That same year, ISM began its Corporate Program to help the employees of corporate members perform at a higher level.

In 2023, ISM introduced the Associate Professional in Supply Management (APSM) certification to create a pathway for students to achieve the CPSM earlier in their careers.

In an attempt to create a common language for the supply management field, ISM introduced the ISM Mastery Model in 2015. Later renamed to ISM Capability Model, it covers 16 core competencies and 73 subcompetencies, the model and its assessment tool identify employee skills gaps and solutions to close them. It also allows companies to benchmark team member skills and create a development roadmap and set job expectations.

Supply Management

ISM defines supply management as:

 ...the identification, analysis, determination, procurement and fulfillment of the goods and services an organization needs to meet short- and long-term objectives. By managing external partners' capabilities and linking them to organizational goals, supply management contributes to the strategic direction of an organization through total cost and capabilities management.

By effective oversight and engagement of people, processes and relationships, supply management creates competitive advantage through innovation, cost management, quality improvement, asset optimization, risk mitigation, social responsibility and sustainability.

Components included under the supply management umbrella are:

 Purchasing/procurement
 Strategic sourcing
 Logistics
 Quality
 Inventory control

 Materials management
 Warehousing/stores
 Transportation/traffic/shipping
 Disposition/investment recovery
 Distribution

 Receiving
 Packaging
 Product/service development
 Manufacturing supervision

ISM Capability Models and Assessments

In 2015, ISM announced the release of the ISM Mastery Model.

Certification Programs

Currently offered certifications
ISM currently offers three professional qualifications: CPSM, CPSD and APSM.

Certified Professional in Supply Management (CPSM)

In 2008, ISM launched its Certified Professional in Supply Management (CPSM) certification to address the changing demands of the profession and the international marketplace. According to ISM's 2022 annual salary survey, the average salary for a CPSM recipient was $132,261.

Certified Professional in Supplier Diversity (CPSD)

ISM's Certified Professional in Supplier Diversity (CPSD), launched in January 2011, is currently the only certification for professionals whose responsibilities include supplier diversity, and it is supported by various diversity organizations such as the National Minority Supplier Development Council and the Women's Business Enterprise National Council. According to ISM's 2022 annual salary survey, the average salary for a CPSD recipient was $150,422.

Previously offered certifications
Two previous certifications, the Certified Purchasing Manager (C.P.M.) and Accredited Purchasing Practitioner (A.P.P.), are no longer offered to new applicants but current designation holders remain eligible for recertification and lifetime certification.

Certified Purchasing Manager (C.P.M.)

ISM's Certified Purchasing Manager (C.P.M.) designation was a popular certification through the 1990s. However, it is no longer offered for testing by ISM and has transitioned into recertification-only status. ISM continues to recertify C.P.M.s who meet continuing education requirements. According to ISM's 2022 annual salary survey, the average salary for a Certified Purchasing Manager (C.P.M.) was $139,457.

Accredited Purchasing Practitioner (A.P.P.)

ISM also offered the Accredited Purchasing Practitioner (A.P.P.) designation for several years. The A.P.P. focused on entry-level purchasing functions for those primarily engaged in the operational side of the supply chain. No longer offered for testing, ISM continues to recertify A.P.P.s who meet continuing education requirements. According to ISM's 2022 annual salary survey, the average salary for an Accredited Purchasing Practitioner (A.P.P.) was $126,047.

Publications
ISM Report On Business

The ISM Report On Business has its roots in the 1920s when N.A.P.A. began polling its members about commodities. During the Great Depression, N.A.P.A. began supplying economic data to President Hoover and the importance of the report has grown to its present significance. Today, it is considered to be one of the most reliable economic barometers of the U.S. economy and gives an important early look at the health of the nation's economy. The Report is based on two national surveys of supply chain professionals tracking changes in the manufacturing, non-manufacturing sectors and hospital subsectors.

Inside Supply Management

ISM publishes a members-only monthly magazine Inside Supply Management (formerly titled The Purchasing Agent, Purchasing Today and NAPM Insights), which debuted in June 1998.

Education
ISM offers a comprehensive curriculum addressing all areas of supply, but with a particular focus on sourcing and procurement, available in different formats.
 Online courses
 Classroom training
 Guided Learning
 Onsite training
 Virtual learning
 Conferences and events
 Webinars

Products and services
 CPSM, CPSD and APSM professional certifications
 ISM Capability Model
 ISM Report On Business
 Conferences
 Seminars
 Corporate training
 Career Center

Partnerships
CAPS Research

CAPS Research, or the Center for Advanced Procurement Strategy, is a B2B nonprofit research center at Arizona State University, serving supply management leaders at Fortune 1000 companies. CAPS was established in 1986 at the W. P. Carey School of Business at Arizona State University in partnership with Institute for Supply Management and is dedicated to providing strategic insight to top global organizations. It also uses supply management KPIs to provide comprehensive benchmarking so companies can see how they compare to other organizations.

Principles and standards
ISM publishes principles of sustainability and social responsibility as well as principles and standards of ethical supply management conduct. Its goal in doing so is to give its members firm guidelines and solutions to help them navigate a complex global environment and problematic business conditions.

Controversies
In 2013, the U.S. Securities and Exchange Commission (SEC) investigated the early release of the June 2013 Manufacturing ISM Report On Business by mass media and information firm Thomson Reuters. According to an article on cnbc.com, there was an upsurge of high-speed trading 15 milliseconds before the report was scheduled to be released:

 ...ISM's manufacturing data was inadvertently sent out early by Thomson Reuters on June 3rd to its high-speed clients, many of whom immediately traded on the information. There was a sharp market reaction to that burst of trading, which prompted downward moves in the SPY ETF, which serves as an investing tool for traders to bet on the overall direction of the market. That downward surge [allowed insiders] more than enough time to profit from early knowledge of market-moving information.

After a telephone inquiry from the SEC about the early release of the data, Thomson Reuters issued a statement explaining that the early release was due to a clock synchronization issue. At the SEC's request, the firm voluntarily provided a redacted copy of its contract with ISM. In an interview with CNBC, ISM CEO Thomas Derry said that after speaking with Thomson Reuters about the mechanics of their release process, he was confident it was an isolated occurrence. He also indicated that “We have not been contacted by any government entity.”

On June 2, 2014, ISM released the ISM Report On Business, its closely followed monthly manufacturing report, and then revised it twice in the span of about two-and-a-half hours, a highly unusual event. The initial figure of 53.2 was lower than anticipated and indicated a slowing of the pace of factory-sector growth, and this caused stocks to dip immediately. Economists quickly queried the accuracy of the report.

ISM's final correction of 55.4 was almost in line with Wall Street expectations, indicating brisk growth, and the stock market rebounded quickly and closed the day with a modest gain. In a statement, ISM attributed the errant report to a software glitch that "incorrectly used the seasonal adjustment factor from the previous month."

References

External links
 
 ISM Report On Business
 CAPS Research

 
Professional associations based in the United States
Supply chain management
Business and finance professional associations